The Inner Circle is a 1946 film noir mystery film directed by Philip Ford starring Adele Mara, Warren Douglas, William Frawley and Ricardo Cortez.

Plot
A secretary frames a private investigator (Warren Douglas) for murder to deflect suspicion away from her younger sister.

Cast
 Adele Mara as Geraldine Travis, alias Gerry Smith
 Warren Douglas as Johnny Strange
 William Frawley as Det. Lt. Webb
 Ricardo Cortez as Duke York
 Virginia Christine as Rhoda Roberts
 Ken Niles as Ken, Radio Announcer
 Will Wright as Henry Boggs
 Dorothy Adams as Emma Wilson
 Martha Montgomery as Anne Travis Lowe
 Edward Gargan as Parking Ticket Cop
 Fred Graham as Duke's Henchman
 Eddie Parker as Duke's Henchman
 Robert J. Wilke as Police Officer Cummings

Reviews
A Variety critic wrote, "The Inner Circle hasn't much to recommend it. Even whodunit addicts will turn a quizzical eyebrow at the tangled, illogical, and crudely put-together story".

References

External links 
 
 
 
 
 
 

1946 films
1946 mystery films
American black-and-white films
Republic Pictures films
American mystery films
1940s American films
1940s English-language films